Robert Dill (born 18 November 1958) is a racing cyclist from  Switzerland. He competed for Switzerland in the 1980 Summer Olympics held in Moscow, Soviet Union in the individual pursuit event where he finished in first place.

Major results
1980
 1st  Individual pursuit, Olympic Games

References

1958 births
Living people
Swiss male cyclists
Olympic cyclists of Switzerland
Olympic gold medalists for Switzerland
Cyclists at the 1976 Summer Olympics
Cyclists at the 1980 Summer Olympics
People from Sierre District
Olympic medalists in cycling
UCI Track Cycling World Champions (men)
Medalists at the 1980 Summer Olympics
Swiss track cyclists
Sportspeople from Valais
20th-century Swiss people
21st-century Swiss people